Goryashchaya Sopka (lit. burning hill) is an explosive stratovolcano on the Kuril Islands in Russia.

It is currently dormant, and its last eruption was in 1914. It has had five explosive eruptions between 1842 and 1914.

See also
 List of volcanoes in Russia

References
 

Simushir
Stratovolcanoes of Russia
Volcanoes of the Kuril Islands
Pleistocene stratovolcanoes
Holocene stratovolcanoes
Calderas of Russia
Pleistocene calderas